The Angarsk constituency (No. 94) is a Russian legislative constituency in Irkutsk Oblast. It was previously located in south-central Irkutsk Oblast, anchoring in Angarsk, Cheremkhovo, Shelekhov and Usolye-Sibirskoye. In 2003 Irkutsk Oblast lost one of its constituencies, so Angarsk constituency absorbed most of former Tulun constituency, which pitted incumbents in both districts against each other. In its current configuration (since 2016) Angarsk constituency stretches from northern Irkutsk to parts of former Ust-Orda Buryat Autonomous Okrug, which had its own constituency in 1993-2007.

Members elected

Election results

1993

|-
! colspan=2 style="background-color:#E9E9E9;text-align:left;vertical-align:top;" |Candidate
! style="background-color:#E9E9E9;text-align:left;vertical-align:top;" |Party
! style="background-color:#E9E9E9;text-align:right;" |Votes
! style="background-color:#E9E9E9;text-align:right;" |%
|-
|style="background-color:"|
|align=left|Viktor Mashinsky
|align=left|Independent
|90,119
|39.12%
|-
|style="background-color:"|
|align=left|Oleg Malov
|align=left|Independent
| -
|26.21%
|-
| colspan="5" style="background-color:#E9E9E9;"|
|- style="font-weight:bold"
| colspan="3" style="text-align:left;" | Total
| 230,390
| 100%
|-
| colspan="5" style="background-color:#E9E9E9;"|
|- style="font-weight:bold"
| colspan="4" |Source:
|
|}

1995

|-
! colspan=2 style="background-color:#E9E9E9;text-align:left;vertical-align:top;" |Candidate
! style="background-color:#E9E9E9;text-align:left;vertical-align:top;" |Party
! style="background-color:#E9E9E9;text-align:right;" |Votes
! style="background-color:#E9E9E9;text-align:right;" |%
|-
|style="background-color:#F5821F"|
|align=left|Viktor Mashinsky (incumbent)
|align=left|Bloc of Independents
|112,148
|42.77%
|-
|style="background-color:#23238E"|
|align=left|Svetlana Koroleva
|align=left|Our Home – Russia
|34,838
|13.29%
|-
|style="background-color:"|
|align=left|Aleksandr Lyuboslavky
|align=left|Democratic Russia and Free Trade Unions
|24,227
|9.24%
|-
|style="background-color:"|
|align=left|Aleksandr Bessalov
|align=left|Independent
|24,178
|9.22%
|-
|style="background-color:"|
|align=left|Pavel Aleshchenko
|align=left|Independent
|15,599
|5.95%
|-
|style="background-color:"|
|align=left|Viktor Kuzmin
|align=left|Independent
|11,596
|4.42%
|-
|style="background-color:#FFF22E"|
|align=left|Vadim Pisarevsky
|align=left|Beer Lovers Party
|6,393
|2.44%
|-
|style="background-color:#000000"|
|colspan=2 |against all
|28,461
|10.86%
|-
| colspan="5" style="background-color:#E9E9E9;"|
|- style="font-weight:bold"
| colspan="3" style="text-align:left;" | Total
| 262,182
| 100%
|-
| colspan="5" style="background-color:#E9E9E9;"|
|- style="font-weight:bold"
| colspan="4" |Source:
|
|}

1999

|-
! colspan=2 style="background-color:#E9E9E9;text-align:left;vertical-align:top;" |Candidate
! style="background-color:#E9E9E9;text-align:left;vertical-align:top;" |Party
! style="background-color:#E9E9E9;text-align:right;" |Votes
! style="background-color:#E9E9E9;text-align:right;" |%
|-
|style="background-color:"|
|align=left|Konstantin Zaytsev
|align=left|Independent
|56,922
|22.53%
|-
|style="background-color:#C21022"|
|align=left|Viktor Mashinsky (incumbent)
|align=left|Party of Pensioners
|55,699
|22.04%
|-
|style="background-color:"|
|align=left|Yevgeny Kanukhin
|align=left|Yabloko
|42,856
|16.96%
|-
|style="background-color:"|
|align=left|Aleksandr Keliberda
|align=left|Independent
|41,639
|16.48%
|-
|style="background-color:"|
|align=left|Aleksandr Chernyshev
|align=left|Independent
|13,721
|5.43%
|-
|style="background-color:"|
|align=left|Oleg Gubenko
|align=left|Independent
|8,728
|3.45%
|-
|style="background-color:#084284"|
|align=left|Valery Tarasov
|align=left|Spiritual Heritage
|1,704
|0.67%
|-
|style="background-color:#000000"|
|colspan=2 |against all
|24,470
|10.91%
|-
| colspan="5" style="background-color:#E9E9E9;"|
|- style="font-weight:bold"
| colspan="3" style="text-align:left;" | Total
| 224,365
| 100%
|-
| colspan="5" style="background-color:#E9E9E9;"|
|- style="font-weight:bold"
| colspan="4" |Source:
|
|}

2003

|-
! colspan=2 style="background-color:#E9E9E9;text-align:left;vertical-align:top;" |Candidate
! style="background-color:#E9E9E9;text-align:left;vertical-align:top;" |Party
! style="background-color:#E9E9E9;text-align:right;" |Votes
! style="background-color:#E9E9E9;text-align:right;" |%
|-
|style="background-color:#FFD700"|
|align=left|Sergey Kolesnikov (incumbent)
|align=left|People's Party
|84,716
|30.25%
|-
|style="background-color:"|
|align=left|Konstantin Zaytsev (incumbent)
|align=left|United Russia
|67,101
|23.96%
|-
|style="background-color:"|
|align=left|Valery Mankov
|align=left|Independent
|41,780
|14.92%
|-
|style="background-color:"|
|align=left|Vladimir Primachek
|align=left|Communist Party
|26,205
|9.36%
|-
|style="background-color:"|
|align=left|Vladimir Shabanov
|align=left|Liberal Democratic Party
|10,737
|3.83%
|-
|style="background-color:"|
|align=left|Lyudmila Drobysheva
|align=left|Yabloko
|8,876
|3.17%
|-
|style="background-color:"|
|align=left|Irina Safronova
|align=left|Independent
|6,695
|2.39%
|-
|style="background-color:#C21022"|
|align=left|Valery Kurochnikov
|align=left|Russian Pensioners' Party-Party of Social Justice
|6,419
|2.29%
|-
|style="background-color:#000000"|
|colspan=2 |against all
|23,836
|8.51%
|-
| colspan="5" style="background-color:#E9E9E9;"|
|- style="font-weight:bold"
| colspan="3" style="text-align:left;" | Total
| 280,319
| 100%
|-
| colspan="5" style="background-color:#E9E9E9;"|
|- style="font-weight:bold"
| colspan="4" |Source:
|
|}

2016

|-
! colspan=2 style="background-color:#E9E9E9;text-align:left;vertical-align:top;" |Candidate
! style="background-color:#E9E9E9;text-align:left;vertical-align:top;" |Party
! style="background-color:#E9E9E9;text-align:right;" |Votes
! style="background-color:#E9E9E9;text-align:right;" |%
|-
|style="background-color:"|
|align=left|Aleksey Krasnoshtanov
|align=left|United Russia
|80,306
|51.74%
|-
|style="background-color:"|
|align=left|Sergey Brenyuk
|align=left|Communist Party
|25,918
|16.70%
|-
|style="background-color:"|
|align=left|Oleg Kuznetsov
|align=left|Liberal Democratic Party
|12,717
|8.19%
|-
|style="background:"| 
|align=left|Maria Kotova
|align=left|Patriots of Russia
|9,793
|6.31%
|-
|style="background-color:"|
|align=left|Aleksey Ponomarev
|align=left|A Just Russia
|6,386
|4.11%
|-
|style="background:"| 
|align=left|Olga Zhakova
|align=left|People's Freedom Party
|3,752
|2.42%
|-
|style="background: "| 
|align=left|Sergey Perevoznikov
|align=left|The Greens
|3,629
|2.34%
|-
|style="background:"| 
|align=left|Dmitry Zenov
|align=left|Communists of Russia
|3,007
|1.94%
|-
|style="background:#00A650"| 
|align=left|Olesya Kovaleva
|align=left|Civilian Power
|2,171
|1.40%
|-
|style="background-color:"|
|align=left|Mikhail Toropov
|align=left|Rodina
|1,419
|0.91%
|-
|style="background:"| 
|align=left|Tatyana Kharun
|align=left|Civic Platform
|799
|0.51%
|-
| colspan="5" style="background-color:#E9E9E9;"|
|- style="font-weight:bold"
| colspan="3" style="text-align:left;" | Total
| 155,211
| 100%
|-
| colspan="5" style="background-color:#E9E9E9;"|
|- style="font-weight:bold"
| colspan="4" |Source:
|
|}

2021

|-
! colspan=2 style="background-color:#E9E9E9;text-align:left;vertical-align:top;" |Candidate
! style="background-color:#E9E9E9;text-align:left;vertical-align:top;" |Party
! style="background-color:#E9E9E9;text-align:right;" |Votes
! style="background-color:#E9E9E9;text-align:right;" |%
|-
|style="background-color:"|
|align=left|Anton Krasnoshtanov
|align=left|United Russia
|69,413
|41.35%
|-
|style="background-color:"|
|align=left|Andrey Akhmadulin
|align=left|Communist Party
|40,244
|23.97%
|-
|style="background-color:"|
|align=left|Irina Smolyarova
|align=left|New People
|15,567
|9.27%
|-
|style="background-color: " |
|align=left|Igor Zuyev
|align=left|A Just Russia — For Truth
|13,879
|8.27%
|-
|style="background-color:"|
|align=left|Dmitry Tyutrin
|align=left|Liberal Democratic Party
|9,623
|5.73%
|-
|style="background-color: "|
|align=left|Vladimir Kochanov
|align=left|Party of Pensioners
|7,603
|4.53%
|-
|style="background-color:"|
|align=left|Yelizaveta Skobelkina
|align=left|Rodina
|2,361
|1.41%
|-
|style="background:;"| 
|align=left|Eduard Gromatsky
|align=left|Civic Platform
|1,826
|1.09%
|-
| colspan="5" style="background-color:#E9E9E9;"|
|- style="font-weight:bold"
| colspan="3" style="text-align:left;" | Total
| 167,880
| 100%
|-
| colspan="5" style="background-color:#E9E9E9;"|
|- style="font-weight:bold"
| colspan="4" |Source:
|
|}

Notes

References

Russian legislative constituencies
Politics of Irkutsk Oblast